Sebastian Fabian "Buckshot" Hoffner (January 20, 1924 – December 17, 2015) was an American politician who was a member of the North Dakota House of Representatives and North Dakota State Senate for 18 years in total. He was raised in Esmond, North Dakota and was a veteran of World War II. He was a founder of Buckstop Junction, a pioneer town museum near Bismarck, North Dakota. Hoffner served as a Democrat in three separate stints in the House of Representatives: from 1962 to 1966, 1968 to 1972 and 1983 to 1984 in addition to serving as the House's minority leader in the 1971 session. During his eight years in the Senate from 1972 to 1980, he was its minority leader from 1975 to 1980. He was an unsuccessful candidate to the United States House of Representatives in 1966 losing to incumbent 1st district Representative Mark Andrews. He also unsuccessfully sought the office of North Dakota Agriculture Commissioner in 1980 and lost the Democratic nomination for Governor of North Dakota in 1984 to eventual winner George A. Sinner. He was the last elected state Chairman of the Nonpartisan League which successfully merged with the North Dakota Democratic Party to become the modern Democratic NPL.

He died on December 17, 2015 in Bismarck, North Dakota.

References

1924 births
2015 deaths
People from Benson County, North Dakota
Democratic Party North Dakota state senators
United States Army personnel of World War II
Candidates in the 1980 United States elections
Candidates in the 1984 United States elections
20th-century American politicians
Democratic Party members of the North Dakota House of Representatives